Saint Domnius (also known as Saint Dujam or Saint Duje, Saint Domnio, Saint Doimus, or Saint Domninus) was a Bishop of Salona (today's Solin) around the year 300, and is venerated as the patron of the nearby city of Split in modern Croatia. Salona was a large Roman city serving as capital of the Province of Dalmatia. Saint Domnius  was martyred with seven other Christians in the persecutions of the Emperor Diocletian. He was born in Antioch, in modern-day Turkey but historically in Syria, and beheaded in 304 at Salona.

He was more likely a martyr of the 4th century, but Christian tradition also states that he was one of the Seventy Disciples of the 1st century. This tradition holds that Domnio came to Rome with Saint Peter and was then sent by Peter to evangelize Dalmatia, where he was martyred along with eight soldiers he had converted.

Veneration
His relics were later moved to the Cathedral of Saint Domnius in Split. When Salona was sacked by the Avars and Slavs in the 6th century, the population eventually moved to the nearby Palace of Diocletian, enlarging the nearby city of Split (Spalatum), and establishing it as the successor to Salona. Saint Domnius became the city's patron saint, and the city's Cathedral of Saint Domnius was built in the mausoleum of Diocletian itself, the emperor who martyred him.

The Basilica of St. John Lateran in Rome claims to own some of Domnio's relics, since Pope John IV, in the 7th century, had requested that relics of a martyr named Domnio be brought to Rome.

See also
Salona
Split
Dalmatia
Diocletian
Diocletian's Palace
Cathedral of St. Duje in Split

References

External links
Patron Saints Index

304 deaths
People from Antioch
3rd-century bishops in Roman Dalmatia
4th-century bishops in Roman Dalmatia
Split, Croatia
4th-century Christian martyrs
Year of birth unknown
Bishops of Split